Coleophora aeneostrigella is a moth of the family Coleophoridae that is endemic to Libya.

References

External links

aeneostrigella
Moths of Africa
Endemic fauna of Libya
Moths described in 1930